Lee L. Buchanan (1893–1958) was an American entomologist.

Biography
Buchanan was born in 1893. Starting from 1917 to 1929 he worked as an assistant biologist for the Bureau of Biological Survey, a division of United States Department of Agriculture. After that, he got a job as entomologist for the Bureau of Entomology and Plant Quarantine, that was also a division of USDA. He kept that position till he retired in 1949. From 1926 to 1958 he also served as an honorary specialist for the Casey Collection of Coleoptera, a division of United States National Museum. He died in 1958.

References

American entomologists
1893 births
1958 deaths
20th-century American zoologists